Jože Benko (born 23 March 1980) is a Slovenian football striker who plays for Minihof/Liebau.

Club career
During his career he has played for top clubs from Prekmurje, Mura and Nafta Lendava. He has also played for Domžale in the Slovenian league.

External links

PrvaLiga profile 
Profile on Nogomania 

1980 births
Living people
People from Murska Sobota
Prekmurje Slovenes
Slovenian footballers
Association football forwards
Slovenian PrvaLiga players
NK Mura players
NK Nafta Lendava players
NK Zavrč players
Iraklis Thessaloniki F.C. players
NK Domžale players
AEK Larnaca FC players
Wuhan F.C. players
China League One players
Lombard-Pápa TFC footballers
Cypriot Second Division players
Slovenian expatriate footballers
Expatriate footballers in Greece
Expatriate footballers in Cyprus
Expatriate footballers in China
Expatriate footballers in Hungary
Expatriate footballers in Austria
Slovenian expatriate sportspeople in Greece
Slovenian expatriate sportspeople in Cyprus
Slovenian expatriate sportspeople in China
Slovenian expatriate sportspeople in Hungary
Slovenian expatriate sportspeople in Austria